Billion Electric Co. Ltd. (Taiex: #3027), based in Taiwan, is an electronics company founded in 1973.

Their range of ADSL modem/routers were introduced into Australia in 2002. Since then, features have been added including 4 port switches, wireless, VoIP, and VPN termination.

See also
 List of companies of Taiwan
List of networking hardware vendors

References 

"Billion gives IPv6 to X-Series customers in New Year". Impress Media Australia. 26 November 2010. Retrieved 28 November 2010.

External links
 

Electronics companies established in 1973
Electronics companies of Taiwan
Networking hardware companies
Manufacturing companies based in New Taipei
1973 establishments in Taiwan